The simple-station Calle 57 is part of the TransMilenio mass-transit system of Bogotá, Colombia, opened in the year 2000.

Location

The station is located in northern Bogotá, specifically on Avenida Caracas, between Calles 54A and 57.

History

In 2000, phase one of the TransMilenio system was opened between Portal de la 80 and Tercer Milenio, including this station.

The station is named Calle 57 due to its proximity to that arterial route. It serves the San Luis and Chapinero neighborhoods.

It also serves passengers for the nearby destinations of the El Campín stadium and the Teatro Santa Fe.

Station Services

Old trunk services

Main Line Service

Special services 
Also, since March 9 of 2013 the following special route works:
  Circular to the neighborhood El Paraíso.

Inter-city service

This station does not have inter-city service.

See also
Bogotá
TransMilenio
List of TransMilenio Stations

External links
TransMilenio
suRumbo.com

TransMilenio